Andriy Kruhlyak (born 22 April 1986) is a retired football striker from Ukraine.

Career
Kruhlyak began his career at Dynamo-2 Kyiv in the Ukrainian First Division in 2002. In 2007, after 77 league appearances and 12 goals for the club, he moved to Latvia to play for Virsliga club FK Liepājas Metalurgs on loan. On 2 August 2007, Kruhlyak scored as Metalurgs beat Belarusian club FC Dinamo Brest 3–1 in the UEFA Cup 2007-08 first qualifying round.

Honours
Club
 Virsliga Runners-up (1): 2007
 Baltic League Champions (1): 2007

References

External links 
 Andriy Kruhlyak footballfacts.ru
 Andriy Kruhlyak allplayers.in.ua

1986 births
Living people
Ukrainian footballers
Ukrainian expatriate footballers
Expatriate footballers in Latvia
FC Desna Chernihiv players
FK Liepājas Metalurgs players
FC Dynamo Kyiv players
FC Prykarpattia Ivano-Frankivsk (2004) players
FC Kremin Kremenchuk players
FC Arsenal-Kyivshchyna Bila Tserkva players
Association football forwards
Footballers from Kyiv